State of shock may refer to:

 shock (circulatory), a circulatory medical emergency
 shock (psychological), a psychological condition
 "State of Shock" (song), a 1984 song by The Jacksons featuring Michael Jackson and Mick Jagger
 State of Shock (D.I. album), 1994
 State of Shock (Ted Nugent album), 1979
 State of Shock (band), a band from Vancouver, Canada